is a high-school romance manga by Mitsuru Adachi. It was published by Shogakukan in 1979–1981 in the magazine Shōjo Comic and collected in five tankōbon volumes. It was later adapted into a live-action television drama series, an anime television series, and an anime film sequel to the television series. The title translates roughly as What a Sunny Day!

Plot

The story focuses on the relationships of Kasumi Kishimoto, a high school student. When she enters Myōjō High School, she moves into her aunt's boarding house, where four boys attending the high school are tenants. Despite her steadfast determination to stay loyal to her boyfriend, who is studying abroad, Kasumi finds herself slowly falling in love with one of the boarders, Yūsaku.

Characters

Voiced by (anime): Yumi Morio, Played by (live): Sayaka Itō
 The main character, and student at Myōjō High School. Because her parents live over an hour away, she decides to stay with her aunt Chigusa who, unbeknownst to Kasumi, has turned her home into a boarding house for four male students at the same high school. After Yūsaku walks in on Kasumi while she takes a bath, she is troubled because she wants to remain faithful to Katsuhiko, her boyfriend. The progress of Kasumi's feelings toward Yūsaku is the central story of the series.

Voiced by (anime): Yūji Mitsuya, Played by (live): Takayuki Takemoto
 Tenant in room #3 at Hidamari Private Boarding House. He is in the same class as Kasumi and a member of the ōendan, or cheering squad. He gets inspired by people who work hard at something, whether or not they are victorious, and likes to support them. Yūsaku eventually joins the Myōjō High School baseball team, playing center fielder, despite not knowing how to play the game. He has a cat, Taisuke, which he finds in a box at the side of the road.

Voiced by (anime): Kobuhei Hayashiya
 Tenant in room #2 at Hidamari Private Boarding House. He is the goalkeeper for the soccer team until Yūsaku convinces him to join the baseball team as its catcher, so that Masato can throw at his full strength as pitcher. He has a crush on Keiko, though she just considers him a friend. He's always hungry, but a very generous person, who is willing to help out just about anyone.

Voiced by (anime): Kaneto Shiozawa
 Tenant in room #4 at Hidamari Private Boarding House. Shin is a ladies man and perverted. He is madly in love with Keiko, though she can't stand him. Shin plays third baseman on the Myōjō High School baseball team. He has a telescope, ostensibly for observing the stars, though more often uses it to peep at neighborhood females. Shin is deathly afraid of cats.

Voiced by (anime): Katsuhiro Nanba
 Tenant in room #1 at the Hidamari Private Boarding House.

Voiced by (anime): Kazue Komiya, Played by (live): Midori Kiuchi
 Kasumi's widowed aunt, landlady of the Hidamari Private Boarding House.

Voiced by (anime): Kazuhiko Inoue
 Kasumi's boyfriend and her aunt Chigusa's late husband's brother's son. His father works in California and he is attending UCLA there, though he returns to Japan once during the series.

Voiced by (anime): Hiromi Tsuru
 A manager of the Myōjō High School baseball team. She is very reserved and has a crush on Yūsaku.

Voiced by (anime): Hirotaka Suzuoki
 Keiko's older brother and Myōjō High School's ace pitcher. His goal is to make it to Kōshien before he graduates.

Voiced by (anime): Eriko Chihara
 Yūsaku's pet cat. Because Yūsaku paid ¥100 for him, he was named after Itagaki Taisuke, the man found on the ¥100 banknote.

Voiced by (anime): Miina Tominaga
 Only appearing for a short period of time, she and her father Sakamoto move into the boarding house. While there the boys are infatuated with her, but she likes Yūsaku Takasugi. Kasumi is jealous of her.

Voiced by (anime): Shigeru Chiba
 The widowed father of Maria Ota. He is attractive, which is why Aunt Chigusa allows them to move in.

Voiced by (anime): Hideyuki Tanaka

Sources:

Live-action drama
The live-action TV drama series ran on NTV from 1982-03-21 through 1982-09-19, for a total of 19 one-hour episodes. The role of Kasumi Kishimoto was at first scheduled to be played by Minako Sawamura, but due to trouble during the shooting of the first episode, the role was given to Sayaka Itō and principal photography with Itō began the following day. The theories as to why Sawamura left include a refusal to do a bath scene and possible schedule conflicts with another show on which she was appearing.

Competing against it in the same time slot were two popular shows: NHK's Taiga drama Tōge no Gunzō and TV Asahi's drama Seibu Keisatsu Part II. Due to this kind of competition, the ratings were not very high for Hiatari Ryōkō!. As this was Adachi's first work adapted for TV, this was disappointing. In the 8pm Sunday time slot, NTV traditionally ran a school drama of some sort, but after the disappointing ratings for Hiatari Ryōkō!, they switched to variety programs in the vein of Kume Hiroshi no TV Scramble and Tensai Takeshi no Tenki ga Deru Terebi!!.

Staff
Original story: Mitsuru Adachi
Screenplay: Yutaka Kaneko, others
Music: Asei Kobayashi, Masahisa Takeichi
Director: Ryō Kinoshita, others
Produced by: Toho

Theme song
The song was produced by CBS/Sony.

Video releases
A DVD box set containing the full series was released by VAP on 2006-02-22.

Sources:

Anime
Hiatari Ryōkō completed its serialization in 1981 with five volumes. However, the television anime adaptation of Adachi's later manga, Touch, became a hit which made it possible for the series to get adapted even after completion. Virtually all of Touch's staff, such as series director Gisaburō Sugii and composer Hiroaki Serizawa, moved to Hiatari Ryōkō as soon as Touch's production concluded. Much of Touch's voice cast was in this anime as well, excluding Noriko Hidaka (Minami Asakura in Touch). It seamlessly replaced Touch, which ran for two years in the same timeslot. The anime television series consisted of 48 half-hour episodes made for Fuji TV, airing from March 22, 1987 to March 20, 1988. It was followed by theatrical anime movie, which served as an alternative version, titled . The movie ran as a double feature with the first Kimagure Orange Road film and included all three of Kimagure's opening theme songs as background music.

Theme songs
There were three opening and three ending theme songs throughout the course of the anime television series.

Opening

Vocals by Aki Asakura, episodes 1–17

Vocals by Hiroaki Serizawa, episodes 18–37

Vocals by Ami Ozaki, episodes 38–48

Ending

Vocals by Yumekojo, episodes 1–17

Vocals by Hiroaki Serizawa, episodes 18–37

Vocals by Ami Ozaki, episodes 38–48

Video releases
The anime series has been released on LD by Toho, and a DVD box set was released in January 2006. The anime movie has been released on VHS and LD by Toho but not DVD.

A high-definition remastered version was sent to Japanese streaming services such as AbemaTV in 2018.

Sources:

Notes

References

External links
 AllCinema Online 
 
 

1980 manga
1982 Japanese television series debuts
1987 anime television series debuts
1988 anime films
Fuji TV original programming
Group TAC
Japanese television dramas based on manga
Mitsuru Adachi
Nippon TV original programming
School life in anime and manga
Shogakukan manga
Shōjo manga